The Million Dollar Round Table (MDRT) is a trade association formed in 1927 to help Insurance brokers and financial advisors establish best business practices and develop ethical and effective ways to increase client interest in financial products, specifically risk based products like life insurance, disability and long term care. As of the end of 2008 the organization has more than 39,000 members in 82 countries and territories.

The name comes from a group of 32 successful life insurance agents who met at the Peabody Hotel in Memphis, Tennessee.  Each agent could demonstrate they had sold more than $1,000,000 of life insurance that year. Their meeting focused on improving technical knowledge and enhancing their sales abilities as well as maintaining ethical standards in the industry. The 1927 meeting evolved into the formation of the organization that exists today. An organization dedicated to encouraging ethical values, sharing ideas and concepts clients have found to be valuable and helping to improve business practices.

MDRT conducts annual meetings that are open to all members. These meetings are held in North America and Asia. Each year more than 10,000 members and guests attend.

MDRT uses the concept of the "Whole Person," which was first presented by philosopher Mortimer Adler. According to Adler, "Whole Persons are engaged in a lifetime quest to achieve balance and congruity in all aspects of their lives and continually seek to develop their full human potential."

Annual qualification requirements for joining include demonstrating a set annual production requirement plus agreeing to adhere to a strict code of ethics. Ethical violations will result in dismissal. To be eligible for a basic membership in 2020, for example, an applicant must meet a production goal of $190,000 in first year commission. MDRT also has established two additional tiers of qualification: Court of the Table and Top of the Table. To qualify for these higher tiers of membership, the applicant must demonstrate annual commission of first year income three to six times the base requirement.

References

Organizations established in 1927
Insurance industry organizations